Jupiter and Antiope is a series of two similar oil-on-canvas paintings by the late Baroque Flemish painter Anthony van Dyck. One painting is in the collection of the Museum of Fine Arts, Ghent; the other in the Wallraf-Richartz Museum, Cologne.

References

Paintings in the collection of the Museum of Fine Arts, Ghent
Collections of the Wallraf–Richartz Museum
Mythological paintings by Anthony van Dyck
Paintings of Jupiter (mythology)
Birds in art